A number of ethnic groups of the People's Republic of China are not officially recognized. Taken together, these groups would constitute the twentieth most populous ethnic group of China. Some scholars have estimated that there are over 200 distinct ethnic groups that inhabit China, compared to 56 groups are officially recognized. There are in addition small distinct ethnic groups that have been classified as part of larger ethnic groups that are officially recognized. Some groups, like the Hui of Xinjiang with the Hui of Fujian, are geographically and culturally separate, except for the shared belief of Islam. Han Chinese, being the world's largest ethnic group, has a large diversity within it, such as in Gansu, whose Han individuals may have genetic traits from the assimilated Tangut civilization. Although they are indigenous to Hainan island and do not speak a Chinese language, the Limgao (Ong-Be) people near the capital (8% of the population) are counted as Han Chinese.

List of ethnic groups

See also
Ethnic minorities in China
List of unrecognized ethnic groups of Guizhou

References

Further reading

External links
 至今没有归属中国尚待被识别的23个少数民族 

 
Ethnic minorities